Rambling 'Round Radio Row (1932 - 1934) is a series of short subjects, produced by Jerry Wald, and released by the Vitaphone division of Warner Brothers. The final film in the series, released 1934, was #3 of the second season, and starred Morton Downey, Baby Rose Marie, The Harmoniacs, and Harriet Lee.

Cast
(The numbers indicate the Vitaphone catalog number on the film each appeared in. See next section below.)

Ray Atwell (#1664)
Harry Barris (#1447)
Smith Ballew (#1453)
Bon Bon (#1473)
Betty Boon (#1662)
Boswell Sisters (#1408)
Eddie Bruce (#1632)
Nat Brusiloff (#1408)
Don Carney (#1473)
Harry Lew Conrad (#1473)
Jack Denny (#1453)
Patsy Flick (#1662)
Jay C. Flippen (#1452)
Edna Froos (#1447)
Sylvia Froos (#1408 & 1447)
The Funnyboners (#1453)
John "Slim" Furness (#1473)
Tess Gardella (#1452)
Sid Gary (#1408)
Tito Guizar (#1474 & 1632)
Bill Hall (#1452)
The Happiness Boys (#1453)
The Harmoniacs (#1664)
Frank Hazzard (#1474)
Fletcher Henderson 
Shemp Howard (#1662)
Shirley Howard (#1632)
Ted Husing (#1447)
Art Jarrett (#1447)
George Jessel (#1662)
Bennie Kreuger (#1447)
Burton Lane (#1447)
Frances Langford (#1453)
Howard Lanin Orchestra (#1452)
Harriet Lee (singer) (#1473 & 1664)
Ann Leaf (#1474)
Welcome Lewis (#1452)
Abe Lyman (#1408)
Johnny Marvin (#1452)
Men About Town (#1632)
Jack Miller, Jr. (#1408)
Ozzie Nelson & Harriet Hilliard 
The Nitwits (vaudeville group) 
Frank Novak, Jr. (#1664)
Ted Pearson (actor) (#1474)
Bob Pease (#1473)
The Pickens Sisters (#1474)
Bonnie Poe
Ramon & Rosita (#1662)
Reis & Dunn (#1453)
Alan Reed (#1632)
Jaques Renard (#1453)
Freddie Rich (#1453)
Buddy Rogers (#1473)
Rose Marie (#1452 & 1664)
Harry Rose (#1473)
Teddy Seco (#1662)
Kate Smith (#1408)
Stoopnagle and Budd (#1408)
The Three Keys (#1473)
Arthur Tracy (#1453)
Vera Van (#1662)
Jane Vance (#1452)
Jerry Wald (#1408, 1447, 1453, 1473 & 1474)
Loyce Whiteman (#1447)
Paul Whiteman & his Rhythm Boys (#1474)
Rudy Wiedoeft (#1447)
Lee Wiley (#1452)
Lois Wilson

List of shorts
(listed by Vitaphone numbers since actual title numbers varied)
Rambling 'Round Radio Row - Vitaphone #1408 / #1, June 25, 1932 (FILM DAILY review)
Rambling 'Round Radio Row - Vitaphone #1447 / #2, October 22, 1932
Rambling 'Round Radio Row - Vitaphone #1452 / #4 (also listed as 3), March 24, 1933 (filmed July 1932)
Rambling 'Round Radio Row - Vitaphone #1453 / #5 (also listed as 4),  June 7, 1933 (filmed September 1932)
Rambling 'Round Radio Row - Vitaphone #1473 / #6 (also listed as 5), April 29, 1933 (MOTION PICTURE HERALD review, filmed July 1932)
Rambling 'Round Radio Row - Vitaphone #1474 / #7 (also listed as 6), June 1933  (filmed September 1932)
Rambling 'Round Radio Row - Vitaphone #1632 / #3 (also listed as 2-1), October 1933
Rambling 'Round Radio Row - Vitaphone #1662 / #1 (also listed as season #3), June 16, 1934
Rambling 'Round Radio Row - Vitaphone #1664 / #8 (also listed as 2-2), May 19, 1934

Notes
The series is available on DVD in the Warner Brothers 6-DVD set Big Band, Jazz & Swing Short Subject Collection.

See also
List of short subjects by Hollywood studio#Warner Brothers
Pepper Pots (Often this series was listed by this umbrella title in trade magazines.)

Notes

References
 Liebman, Roy Vitaphone Films – A Catalogue of the Features and Shorts 2003 McFarland & Company
 Motion Pictures 1912-1939 Catalog of Copyright Entries 1951 Library of Congress

External links 
Ramblin' Round Radio Row at IMDb
Ramblin' Round Radio Row at jabw
Ramblin' Big Band, Jazz & Swing Short Subject Collection

Film series introduced in 1932
Short film series
1930s short films
Vitaphone short films
American black-and-white films
The Three Stooges films
Warner Bros. short films
American comedy films
1930s English-language films
1930s American films